Moro is one of nine parishes (administrative divisions) in Ribadesella, a municipality within the province and autonomous community of Asturias, in northern Spain.

Villages
El Carmen (El Carme)
Fresno (Fresnu)
La Granda
Sardedo (Sardéu)
Soto (Sotu)
Tezangos
Tresmonte
Nocedo (Nocéu)

Parishes in Ribadesella